St. Joseph is an unincorporated community in Cloud County, Kansas, United States.

History
St. Joseph was founded after 1874 by its first Catholic pastor, Father Louis-Marie Mollier. Its inhabitants were originally predominantly Roman Catholics of French American heritage.

St. Joseph had a post office between 1878 and 1901.

Education
The community is served by Clifton-Clyde USD 224 public school district, which has three schools:
 Clifton-Clyde Senior High School, located in Clyde.
 Clifton-Clyde Middle School, located in Clifton.
 Clifton-Clyde Grade School, located in Clifton.

Notable people
 Louis Mollier (1846-1911), Roman Catholic priest from 1874 to 1911.

References

Further reading

External links
 , from Hatteberg's People on KAKE TV news
 Cloud County maps: Current, Historic, KDOT

French-American history
Unincorporated communities in Cloud County, Kansas
Unincorporated communities in Kansas
Catholic Church in Kansas